Clare Dunne is an Irish actress, born in Dublin. She has appeared in stage roles with the Abbey Theatre and the National Theatre.

Career

Dunne's work at the Abbey Theatre includes Juno and the Paycock (a co-production between the Abbey Theatre and the National Theatre). Other theatre work includes The Cripple of Inishmaan, The Silver Tassie, Druid 35 and The Playboy of the Western World (Druid), Julius Caesar (Donmar Warehouse), Detroit (National Theatre), Three Sisters (Lyric Hammersmith and Filter), A Midsummer Night's Dream (Filter at Latitude) and Crunch (Nabakov). Dunne wrote and performed Living with Missy (Smock Alley Theatre). Radio work includes On Her Majesty's Service and News from Home (BBC Radio 4). Dunne graduated from the Royal Welsh College of Music & Drama, Cardiff in 2009.

Dunne played Prince Hal in the Donmar Warehouse and St. Ann's Warehouse all-female version of Shakespeare's Henry IV, directed by Phyllida Lloyd.

In 2015, Dunne starred in Grounded, by George Brant, in the Dublin Fringe Festival.

Dunne's film work includes the shorts The Cherishing (2016) and Nice Night for It (2017).

Dunne portrayed Victoria in Spider-Man: Far From Home (2019). She then co-wrote and starred as Sandra in Herself (2020), which reunited her with director Phyllida Lloyd.

Filmography

Film

Television

References

Actresses from Dublin (city)
Living people
Year of birth missing (living people)